Afterglow is the fourth album by Swedish melodic death metal band In Mourning, released on 20 May 2016 via Agonia Records. It is their last album with founding bassist Pierre Stam, and their only album with drummer Daniel Liljekvist, formerly of Katatonia.

Track listing

Credits

Musicians 
 Tobias Netzell – vocals, guitars
 Björn Pettersson – guitars, vocals
 Tim Nedergård – guitars
 Pierre Stam – bass
 Daniel Liljekvist – drums

References 

2016 albums
In Mourning (band) albums